"Un Zombie a la Intemperie" ("A Zombie at the Outdoor") is a song by Spanish singer-songwriter Alejandro Sanz. "Zombie" was written by Sanz and produced by the Sebastian Krys, and was released as the lead single for Sanz's eleventh studio album Sirope (2015). A salsa version was recorded with Nicaraguan singer Luis Enrique. There is also a version with the Italian singer-songwriter Zucchero. The Spanish charts are listed twice because there are two different charts one includes streaming and the other does not. The song earned a nominations for Record of the Year and Song of the Year at the 16th Latin Grammy Awards.

Track listing
Digital download
 "Un Zombie a la Intemperie" -

Videoclip

Charts

Weekly charts

Year-end charts

References

2015 singles
Alejandro Sanz songs
Songs written by Alejandro Sanz
Spanish-language songs
Pop ballads
Number-one singles in Spain
2015 songs
Universal Music Spain singles